Sts. Peter & Paul School is a private Roman Catholic high school in St. Thomas, United States Virgin Islands. It is located within the Diocese of St. Thomas and is the only Catholic high school on St. Thomas.

Background
Saints Peter & Paul School was established in 1924 as an elementary school. The high school program began in 1946 with its first class graduating in 1950. It serves children from pre-kindergarten through grade 12.

References

External links
Official Website

1924 establishments in the United States Virgin Islands
Educational institutions established in 1924
High schools in the United States Virgin Islands
Catholic secondary schools in the United States Virgin Islands